The gens Arellia was a plebeian family at Rome.  Although of equestrian rank, this gens does not appear to have been particularly large or important, and is known primarily from three individuals.

Members
 Arellius, a talented painter at Rome in the latter part of the first century BC, who gained notoriety for depicted goddesses with the features of his own mistresses.
 Arellius Fuscus, a rhetorician in Greek and Latin at Rome, around the beginning of the first century.  He was a tutor of Ovid and Fabianus, and a rival of Marcus Porcius Latro.  His son, who had the same name, was also a rhetorician.
 Quintus Arellius Fuscus, either the father or the son, bore the praenomen Quintus, but it is not certain which.

See also
 List of Roman gentes

References

Bibliography
 Lucius Annaeus Seneca (Seneca the Elder), Controversiae (Controversies), Suasoriae (Rhetorical Exercises).
 Gaius Plinius Secundus (Pliny the Elder), Historia Naturalis (Natural History).
 Dictionary of Greek and Roman Biography and Mythology, William Smith, ed., Little, Brown and Company, Boston (1849).

Roman gentes